Maja Micunović (born 2 January 1997) is a Montenegrin footballer who plays as a defender. She has been a member of the Montenegro women's national team.

References

1997 births
Living people
Women's association football defenders
Montenegrin women's footballers
Montenegro women's international footballers
ŽFK Ekonomist players